Mount Gede or Gunung Gede (Big Mountain in Sundanese) is a stratovolcano in West Java, Indonesia. The volcano contains two peaks with Mount Gede as one peak and Mount Pangrango for the other one. Three major cities, Cianjur, Sukabumi and Bogor, are located in the volcano complex at the east, south and northwest, respectively, along with suburban growth.  Seven craters are located in the complex: Baru, Gumuruh (2,927 m), Lanang (2,800 m), Kawah Leutik, Ratu (2,800 m), Sela (2,709 m) and Wadon (2,600 m). Historical volcanic activity has been recorded since the 16th century.  With the amalgamation and growth of Greater Jakarta with those 3 cities, dense suburban growth has engulfed the fringes of the volcano, home to roughly 4 million people.
Though not listed  as one of the Decade Volcanoes  or thought to produce large eruptions, the huge populations nearby give a potential for severe destruction if indeed a large eruption did occur.

See also

 Gunung Padang Megalithic Site
 Gunung Gede Pangrango National Park
 List of volcanoes in Indonesia

References 

Stratovolcanoes of Indonesia
Volcanoes of West Java
Biosphere reserves of Indonesia
Active volcanoes of Indonesia